

Champions

Major League Baseball
World Series: Cincinnati Reds over Detroit Tigers (4-3)
All-Star Game, July 9 at Sportsman's Park: National League, 4-0

Other champions
Amateur World Series: Cuba
Negro League Baseball All-Star Game: East, 11-0

Awards and honors

Most Valuable Player
Hank Greenberg (AL) – OF, Detroit Tigers
Frank McCormick (NL) – 1B, Cincinnati Reds
The Sporting News Player of the Year Award
Bob Feller – P, Cleveland Indians
The Sporting News Most Valuable Player Award
Hank Greenberg (AL) – OF, Detroit Tigers
Frank McCormick (NL) – 1B, Cincinnati Reds
The Sporting News Manager of the Year Award
Bill McKechnie – Cincinnati Reds

Statistical leaders

Major league baseball final standings

American League final standings

National League final standings

Negro league baseball final standings

Negro American League final standings

Negro National League final standings

Events

January
January 1 - Kenesaw Mountain Landis voids a trade that would have sent pitcher George Coffman and second baseman Benny McCoy to the Philadelphia A's in exchange for outfielder Wally Moses. Landis claims the Tigers hid McCoy as his reason for voiding the trade, setting in motion a decision he would make later that month.
January 10- The Brooklyn Dodgers signed pitcher Wes Ferrell as a free agent. 
January 14 – Commissioner Kenesaw Mountain Landis declares 87 players from the Detroit Tigers' farm system free agents because they had been "hidden" from other teams. The move allows Benny McCoy to sign with the Philadelphia A's as a free agent. 
January 31 - Catcher and future spy for the U.S. Government, catcher Moe Berg, is released by the Boston Red Sox.

February
February 2 - The election of a Negro National League president ends in a deadlock, with three owners voting for incumbent Tom Wilson and three voting for New York City businessman C. B. Powell.
February 23 - A compromise by Alex Pompez ended a three-week stalemate between the Negro National League clubs over the election of a league president and the role of promoter Eddie Gottlieb. League president Tom Wilson, vice president Ed Bolden, and secretary Cumberland Posey were all reelected for the 1940 season. Newark Eagles owner Abe Manley, who opposed Wilson's reelection, became league treasurer. Gottlieb was allowed to continue promoting the majority of games at Yankee Stadium, but the New York Black Yankees were allowed to promote a double-header at their own home field.
February 24 - The Brooklyn Dodgers work out a trade with the Boston Red Sox. The deal sees the Dodgers Send Red Evans and Art Parker, along with $3,500 cash to acquire Pee Wee Reese.

March
March 7 - The National League defeats the AL in a charity exhibition All-Star game. The contest is broadcast on the Mutual Broadcasting System raises more than $20,000. The funds are used to help citizens of Finland whose homes and businesses were destroyed in an attack by the USSR.

April
April 16 – The Cleveland Indians' Bob Feller pitches a 1-0 opening day no-hitter against the Chicago White Sox.
April 23 – Hall of famer Pee Wee Reese makes his major league debut at shortstop for the Brooklyn Dodgers.
April 30 – Tex Carleton pitches a no-hitter as the Brooklyn Dodgers defeat the Cincinnati Reds, 3–0.

May
May 7 -The St. Louis Cardinals defeat the Brooklyn Dodgers, 18–2. The Cards have 49 bases on twenty hits, including thirteen extra-base hits and seven home runs.
May 8 - The Cincinnati Reds trade outfielder Vince DiMaggio to the Pittsburgh Pirates for outfielder Johnny Rizzo. 
May 13 - Pitcher Willis Hudlin is released by the Cleveland Indians. Three days later he signs with the Washington Senators and continues a journey that will see him pitch for four different teams in the 1940 season.
May 20 - Pinky Higgins belts three home runs, hitting them in the fourth, fifth, and seventh innings in the Tigers 10–7 win over Boston. 
May 22 - The Brooklyn Dodgers sign Al Campanis as a free agent.
May 24 - The St. Louis Browns play their first home game under artificial lights, but the hometown fans go home unhappy as the team falls to Bob Feller and the Cleveland Indians 3–2. In the National League on the same night, the New York Giants defeat the Boston Braves 8–1 in the first night game played at the polo grounds.

June
June 4 - In the first game under the lights for the St. Louis Cardinals, Joe Medwick goes five for five, hitting three doubles, yet the Cardinals fall to the Brooklyn Dodgers 10–1.
June 5 - After purchasing his contract earlier in the year, the New York Giants return Johnny Broaca, who was playing in the minor leagues, to the Cleveland Indians. The Indians then turn around and place Broaca on waivers, and he never pitches in the major leagues again. 
June 6 – The Boston Bees sign 19-year-old left-handed pitcher Warren Spahn.
June 8 - Harry Craft hits a three run home run in the fifth inning of a contest against the Brooklyn Dodgers. The hit completes the cycle for Craft, who finished the game five for five as Cincinnati defeats Brooklyn 23–2. 
June 12 - In one of the seasons biggest trades, the Brooklyn Dodgers acquire Joe Medwick and pitcher Curt Davis, along with cash, from the St. Louis Cardinals in exchange for outfielder Ernie Koy and pitcher Carl Doyle, along with Bert Haas and Sam Nahem. The deal is one of the first made by GM Larry MacPhail to turn the Dodgers into a contending team. 
June 15 – In a 12–1 victory over the Pittsburgh Pirates, the New York Giants' Harry Danning hits for a cycle against that includes an inside-the-park home run. The ball became lodged behind an Eddie Grant memorial in front of the Giants' clubhouse.
June 18 - Joe Medwick, recently acquired by Brooklyn from the St. Louis Cardinals, is beaned by former teammate Bob Bowman. As Medwick is carried from the field on a stretcher, an enraged Larry MacPhail demands criminal charges be brought against Bowman, as MacPhail insisted the beaning was in response to a beef between the two ball players.

July
July 9 – Boston Bees outfielder Max West hits a three-run home run in the first inning, as the National League defeats the American League, 4–0, in the All-Star Game at Sportsman's Park, home of the St. Louis Cardinals.
July 15 - Willis Hudlin is released by the Washington Senators. One week later, he signs with the New York Giants, making the Giants the third team Hudlin would pitch for that season.

August
August 3 - Upset by what he viewed as a poor performance against the Boston Bees, Cincinnati Reds catcher Willard Hershberger takes his own life hours before a double header against Boston. 
 Less than a week after being released by the Giants, Willis Hulin signs with the St. Louis Browns, thus making the Browns the fourth team Hudlin pitched for in during the 1940 season.

September
September 24 – Jimmie Foxx hit his career 500th home run.
September 30 – The Cleveland Indians finish one-game behind the Detroit Tigers in the American League pennant race, thus disappointing Ohio baseball fans who had been rooting all season long for what would have been the only All-Ohio World Series in baseball history, between the National League champions Cincinnati Reds and  the Cleveland Indians.

October
October 8 – The Cincinnati Reds defeat the Detroit Tigers, 2–1, in Game 7 of the World Series to win their second World Championship, four games to three.  This was Cincinnati's first World Series victory since the infamous Black Sox scandal in 1919. Reds' Bill McKechnie became the first manager to win World Series with two different teams. In 1925 he had won the Classic as manager of the Pittsburgh Pirates.

November
November 11 – Brooklyn Dodgers general manager Larry MacPhail  acquires starting pitcher Kirby Higbe, from the Philadelphia Phillies, in exchange for catcher Mickey Livingston, pitchers Bill Crouch and Vito Tamulis, and $100,000.

December
December 5 - The New York Yankees sell the contract of outfielder Jake Powell to the San Francisco Seals of the Pacific Coast League. 
December 12 – The Boston Red Sox send Doc Cramer to the Washington Senators for Gee Walker, then package him with Jim Bagby & Gene Desautels, and send them to the Cleveland Indians for Joe Dobson, Odell Hale & Frankie Pytlak. They also purchase Pete Fox's contract from the Detroit Tigers.

Births

January
January 4 – Bart Shirley
January 6 – Elvio Jiménez
January 7 – Jim Hannan
January 8 – Dick Kelley
January 10 – Dave Skaugstad
January 11 – Hank Fischer
January 12 – George Kernek
January 13 – Ron Brand
January 16 – Bob Baird
January 16 – Rod Miller
January 21 – Rich Beck
January 23 – Dick Burwell

February
February 14 – Len Gabrielson
February 19 – Bill Kelso
February 21 – Doug Gallagher
February 25 – Danny Cater
February 25 – Ron Santo

March
March 1 – Larry Brown 
March 6 – Willie Stargell
March 10 – Mitsuhiro Adachi
March 13 – Gary Kolb
March 18 – Tony Martínez
March 19 – Pete Smith
March 22 – Dick Ellsworth

April
April 3 – José Vidal
April 5 – Ron Campbell
April 11 – Dick Wantz
April 12 – Woodie Fryman
April 15 – Willie Davis
April 16 – Garry Roggenburk
April 21 – Bill Faul
April 24 – Terry Tata

May
May 6 – Bill Hands
May 10 – John R. Keennan
May 11 – Harry Fanok
May 12 – Tom Timmermann
May 18 – Jim Hicks
May 20 – Sadaharu Oh

June
June 2 – Horace Clarke
June 2 – Jim Maloney
June 12 – Del Bates
June 19 – Isao Harimoto
June 28 – Gary Wagner

July
July 3 – Coco Laboy
July 3 – César Tovar
July 8 – Bucky Brandon
July 10 – Gene Alley
July 10 – Pete Craig
July 12 – Mike Page
July 12 – Jack Warner
July 13 – Jack Aker
July 13 – Frank Bork
July 16 – Tom Metcalf
July 18 – Joe Torre
July 21 – John Bateman
July 21 – Denis Menke
July 23 – Hank Allen
July 24 – Ethan Blackaby

August
August 3 – Roger Repoz
August 5 – Ossie Chavarría
August 13 – Tony Cloninger
August 15 – Arlo Brunsberg
August 15 – José Santiago
August 18 – Paul Popovich
August 25 – Don Wallace
August 28 – Tom Satriano
August 31 – Ramón Hernández
August 31 – Cleo James

September
September 1 – Pat House
September 10 – Bob Chance
September 11 – Jackie Hernández
September 12 – Rich Barry
September 12 – Mickey Lolich
September 15 – Frank Linzy
September 17 – Cisco Carlos
September 21 – Jerry Fosnow
September 24 – Curt Motton

October
October 1 – John Schuerholz
October 7 – Morrie Steevens
October 9 – Joe Pepitone
October 10 – Larry Maxie
October 10 – Grover Powell
October 12 – Glenn Beckert
October 14 – Tommy Harper
October 14 – Billy Sorrell
October 16 – Dave DeBusschere
October 27 – Héctor Valle

November
November 8 – Joe Nossek
November 9 – Don Loun
November 16 – Buster Narum
November 18 – Cal Koonce
November 20 – Jeffrey Loria
November 21 – Tommy McCraw
November 23 – Billy Ott
November 23 – Luis Tiant
November 25 – Dennis Aust

December
December 1 – Cecil Perkins
December 3 – Chico Salmon
December 5 – John Papa
December 8 – Brant Alyea
December 10 – Weldon Bowlin
December 12 – Tom Brown
December 13 – Nate Oliver
December 20 – Thad Tillotson
December 22 – Elrod Hendricks
December 26 – Ray Sadecki

Deaths

January
January 3 – Mike Mahoney, 88, first baseman who played from 1897 to 1898 for the Boston Beaneaters and St. Louis Browns.
January 3 – Parke Swartzel, 74, pitcher for the 1889 Kansas City Cowboys.
January 12 – Ed Keas, 77, pitcher for the 1888 Cleveland Blues of the American Association.
January 20 – Wally Andrews, 60,  infield utility man who played with the Louisville Eclipse in 1884 and for the Louisville Colonels in 1888.
January 31 – Red Fisher, 52, left fielder who played in 1910 with the St. Louis Browns of the American League.

February
February 5 – Frank Decker, 83, catcher/infielder who played with the Syracuse Stars in 1879 and for the St. Louis Brown Stockings in 1882.
February 5 – Byrd Lynn, 50, Chicago White Sox catcher who served as a backup for Hall of Famer Ray Schalk and also was a member of the White Sox club that won the World Series in 1917.
February 13 – Walter Barnes, 79, sports editor for several Boston newspapers from 1891 to 1933 who was that city's first regular sports columnist.
February 15 – Chick Fulmer, 89, shortstop who played for eight teams in three different leagues during 11 seasons from 1871 to 1884.
February 15 – Ray Morgan, 50, second baseman who was part of a stellar double play combo along with shortstop George McBride for the Washington Senators from 1911 through 1918.
February 16 – Charlie Berry, 79, second baseman for the Altoona Mountain City, Kansas City Cowboys, and Chicago Browns/Pittsburgh Stogies during the 1884 Union Association season.
February 21 – John Taber, 71, pitcher for the 1890 Boston Beaneaters of the National League.
February 26 – Matt Broderick, 62,  second baseman for the Brooklyn Superbas of the National League in 1903.

March
 March 2 – Matt Kilroy, 73, pitcher for six teams in 10 seasons spanning 1896–1898, who won 46 games in 1887, hurled a no-hitter in 1886 and struck out 513 batters that season, the most ever in a single season and far ahead of second-place Charles Radbourn, who struck out 441 in 1884
 March 6 – Marshall Locke, 82, outfielder for the 1884 Indianapolis Hoosiers
 March 7 – Johnny Johnston, 49, left fielder who played with the St. Louis Browns in 1913
 March 13 – Ira Flagstead, 46, outfielder with a strong arm and a reliable glove who played for the Detroit Tigers, Boston Red Sox, Washington Senators and Pittsburgh Pirates in a span of 14 seasons from 1917 to 1930, hitting .290 with 40 home runs and 450 RBI in 1,218 career games, while leading all American League outfielders for the most assists in 1923 (31) and 1925 (24), and for the best fielding average in 1927 (.986)
 March 22 – Libe Washburn, 29, outfielder and pitcher who played from 1902 to 1903 with the New York Giants and Philadelphia Phillies
 March 30 – Roy Crabb, 49, pitcher for the Chicago White Sox and Philadelphia Athletics during the 1912 season
 March 30 – George McQuillan, 55, pitcher for the Philadelphia Phillies, Cincinnati Reds, Pittsburgh Pirates and Cleveland Indians during ten seasons from 1907 to 1918, who in 1907 set one of the longest-lived records in Major League history when he pitched 25 innings before giving up the first earned run of his career, a feat broken by Brad Ziegler in 2008.

April
April 8 – Bill Abstein, 57, first baseman who played for the Pittsburgh Pirates and St. Louis Browns in part of three seasons spanning 1906–1910.
April 8 – Dave Murphy, 63, shortstop for the 1905 Boston Beaneaters.
April 10 – Tom Seaton, 52, pitcher for the Philadelphia Phillies, Brooklyn Tip-Tops, Newark Pepper and Chicago Cubs in six seasons from 1912 to 1917, who posted a record of 93-63 and a 3.14 ERA in 231 career games, while leading the National League in wins and strikeouts during the 1913 season.
April 12 – Fred Klobedanz, 68, pitcher for the Boston Beaneaters in a span of five seasons from 1896 to 1902, who was a member of the Boston team that clinched the National League pennant in 1897 and 1898 and led the league in winning percentage in 1897.
April 22 – Alex Hardy, 62, Canadian-born pitcher who played for the Chicago Cubs/Orphans of the National League in 1902 and 1903.
April 28 – Henry Cote, 76, pitcher for the Louisville Colonels of the National League in the 1894 and 1895 seasons.
April 30 – Patsy Dougherty, 63, outfielder for the Boston Americans and Chicago White Sox clubs that won the World Series in 1903 and 1906 respectively, who became the first player to hit two home runs in a single World Series game with a pair in 1903, while leading the American League with 47 stolen bases in 1908.

May
May 5 – Bill Wise, 79, pitcher/outfielder who played for the Baltimore Orioles of the American Association in 1882, the Washington Nationals of the Union Association in 1884, and the Washington Nationals of the National League in 1886.
May 8 – Chick Fraser, 66, pitcher for seven teams in 14 seasons from 1896 through 1909, most prominently for  the 1907 and 1908 Chicago Cubs clubs that won the World Series, who hurled a no-hitter in 1903 and ranks second on the all-time list  of most hit batsmen by a Major League Baseball pitcher.
May 14 – Harry Gaspar, 57, pitcher who played from 1909 through 1912 for the Cincinnati Reds.
May 16 – Spike Shannon, 62, outfielder over parts of five seasons from 1904 to 1908 with the St. Louis Cardinals, New York Giants and Pittsburgh Pirates, who led the National League for the most scored runs in the 1907 season.

June
June 1 – Logan Drake, 40, pitcher who made ten total appearances for 1922–1924 Cleveland Indians.
June 3 – Billy Kelly, 54, catcher.
June 4 – Phil Baker, 86, first baseman/catcher.
June 16 – Bill Hawes, 83, outfielder/first baseman.
June 19 – Ed Pabst, 72, outfielder.
June 24 – Bert Adams, 49, catcher.
June 24 – Axel Lindstrom, 44, pitcher.
June 26 – Jimmie Savage, 56, outfielder.
June 26 – Billy Reid, 83, second baseman.
June 27 – Frank Thompson, 44, third baseman.

July
July 3 – John Stafford, 70, pitcher.
July 5 – George Yeager, 66, catcher.
July 13 – Ollie Tucker, 38, outfielder.
July 16 – Bill Leith, 67, pitcher.
July 19 – John Heileman, 67, third baseman.
July 22 – Charlie Swindells, 61, pitcher.
July 27 – Tom Williams, 69, pitcher/outfielder.
July 28 – Red Ehret, 71, pitcher.
July 28 – Stan Yerkes, 65, pitcher.

August
August 3 – Willard Hershberger, 30, Cincinnati Reds' catcher who committed suicide in his hotel room as the Reds were visiting the Boston Bees during a weekend series; he was hitting .309 in 48 games when he died; the Reds dedicated the 1940 season to his memory, then won NL pennant by 12 games and the seven-game 1940 World Series.
August 5 – Ed Bruyette, 65, outfielder.
August 13 – Buck Stanley, 50, pitcher.
August 14 – Charlie Hollocher, 44, shortstop for the 1918–1924 Chicago Cubs, appearing in 760 career games.
August 17 – Bock Baker, 62, pitcher.
August 21 – Ernest Thayer, 77, newspaper editor whose 1888 poem "Casey at the Bat" became a staple of baseball culture.
August 24 – Ed Hallinan, 52, shortstop.
August 28 – Charlie Johnson, 55, outfielder.

September
September 1 – Gus Dundon, 66, second baseman.
September 3 – Johnny Welch, 33, pitcher.
September 10 – Bill Shipke, 57, third baseman.
September 14 – Andy Knox, 76, first baseman.
September 15 – Ed Yewell, 78, outfielder/infielder.
September 21 – Billy Otterson, 78, shortstop.
September 25 – Mike Jordan, 77, outfielder.

October
October 5 – Crazy Schmit, 74, pitcher.
October 9 – Bill Massey, 69, first baseman.
October 17 – George Davis, 70, Hall of Fame shortstop for the Cleveland Spiders, New York Giants and Chicago White Sox in 20 seasons spanning 1890–1909, who hit over .300 in nine consecutive seasons from 1893 to 1901, fashioned a then-record 33-game hitting streak in 1893, and set Major League records for the most career hits (2600+) and RBI (1437) by a switch-hitter, while leading the Hitless Wonder White Sox in their victory over the Chicago Cubs in the 1906 World Series.
October 23 – Harry Krause, 52, pitcher.

November
November 3 – Joe Burke, 72, third baseman.
November 4 – George Bird, 90, outfielder.
November 5 – Bill Mellor,  66, first baseman.
November 12 – Joe Quinn, 75, second baseman.
November 14 – George Clark, 49, pitcher for the 1913 New York Yankees.
November 18 – John Harkins, 81, pitcher.

December
December 7 – Harry Eells, 60, pitcher.
December 16 – Billy Hamilton, 74, Hall of Fame center fielder and a prolific hitter who hit better than .300 in 12 successive seasons en route to a career mark of .344, including two batting crowns, while collecting eleven 100-run seasons with a record 192 in 1894; 914 career stolen bases, a single-season total of 111 steals in 1891 and a single-game of seven in 1894, ending his career as one of only three big leaguers whose runs scored (1,691) exceeded his games played (1,578).
December 18 – John Kiley, 81, left fielder/pitcher.
December 22 – Patsy McGaffigan, 52, infielder.
December 22 – Bill Schwartz, 76, catcher.

References

External links